Hans Sperre Jr. (born 13 September 1967) is a Norwegian badminton player. He competed in the men's singles tournament at the 1992 Summer Olympics.

References

External links
 

1967 births
Living people
People from Sandefjord
Norwegian male badminton players
Badminton players at the 1992 Summer Olympics
Olympic badminton players of Norway
Sportspeople from Vestfold og Telemark